The National Targeting Center (NTC) is a division of U.S. Customs and Border Protection (CBP). It is based in Sterling, Virginia.  The NTC observes air traffic and trade activities, gathers and vets intelligence, and is empowered to send e-mails requesting that U.S. citizens be detained and questioned.  

The National Targeting Center includes several divisions, including: NTC-Cargo, NTC-Passenger, Counter-Network, and National Targeting Center – Investigations (NTC-I).  The latter was established in 2013.

The NTC was initially established in 2001; its original name was Office of Border Security.

In 2017, the NTC approached journalists "as part of a broader effort to get reporters to write about forced labor around the world as a national security issue."  The journalists included Ali Watkins and Martha Mendoza.

In 2021, CBP launched an investigation of the NTC's targeting of journalists, members of Congress, and others.

References

Government agencies established in 2001
2001 establishments in Washington, D.C.
United States Department of Homeland Security agencies